Titagarh Assembly constituency was an assembly constituency in North 24 Parganas district in the Indian state of West Bengal.

Overview
As a consequence of the orders of the Delimitation Commission, while Barrackpore Assembly constituency comes into existence in 2011, Titagarh Assembly constituency ceases to exist from the same year.

Titagarh Assembly constituency was part of 15. Barrackpore (Lok Sabha constituency).

Members of Legislative Assembly

Note: For MLAs from the area in subsequent years see Barrackpore Assembly constituency

Election results

1977–2006
In the 2006, 2001, 1996 and 1991 state assembly elections Dr. Pravin Kumar Shaw of CPI(M) won the 133 Titagarh assembly seat defeating Meena Ghosh of Trinamool Congress in 2006, Ashok Shukla of Trinamool Congress in 2001 and Congress in 1996, and Ganga Prasad Saha of Congress in 1991. Ganga Prasad Show of Congress defeated Mohammed Amin of CPI (M) in 1987 and 1982.Mohammed Amin of CPI (M) defeated Ganga Prasad Show of Congress in 1977.

1951–1972
Mohammed Amin of CPI(M) won in 1972, 1971 and 1969. Krishna Kumar Shukla of Congress won in 1967,1962,1957 and in independent India’s first election in 1951.

References

Former assembly constituencies of West Bengal
Politics of North 24 Parganas district